USS LST-985 was an LST-542-class tank landing ship in the United States Navy. Like many of her class, she was not named and is properly referred to by her hull designation.

LST-985 was laid down on 3 January 1944 at the Boston Navy Yard; launched on 25 February 1944; sponsored by Mrs. Charles E. Schofield; and commissioned on 7 April 1944.

Service history
LST-985 apparently did not see combat service during World War II.

Following World War II, LST-985 performed occupation duty in the Far East and saw service in China until mid-March 1946. She returned to the United States and was decommissioned on 11 June 1946 and struck from the Navy list on 3 July that same year. On 13 October 1947, the ship was sold to William E. Skinner for scrapping.

References

 

LST-542-class tank landing ships
World War II amphibious warfare vessels of the United States
Ships built in Boston
1944 ships